The Duke Blue Devils women's soccer team represent Duke University in the Atlantic Coast Conference (ACC) of NCAA Division I women's college soccer.  The team was founded in 1988.  The Blue Devils have won the ACC regular season championship three times. The team has advanced to the NCAA Women's soccer tournament 25 times, including 4 College Cup appearances.

History

1980s
Duke Women's Soccer was established in 1988 under head coach Bill Hempen, who was a Duke Men's soccer coach prior to this position. Hempen was assisted by Carla Overbeck, a previous player at UNC Chapel Hill. While at UNC, Overbeck remained unbeaten for four seasons, and won four national championships. Dukes first two seasons were successful ones.  The team won 10 games in their inaugural 1988 season, and followed that with 14 wins in 1989.  The two seasons had a combined 1–4–1 ACC record and the team did not make an NCAA Tournament appearance in either season.

1990s
The 1990s began with a similar story of out of conference success, but ACC struggle.  The Blue Devils only managed one ACC win each season in 1990–1992.  However, in 1992, the team finished as runner up in the ACC Tournament and qualified for the NCAA Tournament.  In their first-ever NCAA appearance, Duke made it all the way to the final, only to lose to North Carolina. This began a string of six consecutive NCAA appearances for the team.  The Blue Devils also notched a then program record 17 wins in 1992 and 1994.  The streak of NCAA Tournament appearances ended in 1998, when the Blue Devils failed to qualify for the tournament after a 7–11–2 season.  During this stretch the team never advanced past the second round in the NCAA Tournament, but did win double digit games in each year.  The decade ended with a return to the NCAA tournament and a 13–10–0 season in 1999.

In 1999, while coaching at Duke, Overbeck played in the 1999 FIFA Women's World Cup as a captain. This team went on to win the world championship.

2000s
In 2001, the Duke Women's Soccer program received a new head coach, Robbie Church,. Church was assisted by Overbeck and Billy Lesesne, who had coached with Church at Vanderbilt.  Previous coach, Bill Hempen, took a new job with the Colorado Buffaloes.  The transition would prove a difficult one, with the Blue Devils winning 9 and 8 games in Hempen's first two seasons.  In 2002, Duke missed the NCAA Tournament for only the second time in 11 years.  However, the lull would not last for long.  2003 saw the team win 14 games and start a new streak of NCAA appearances.  The following year, 2004, the Blue Devils won 15 games and reached the NCAA Round of 16.  The team reached the NCAA Tournament for the remainder of the decade, and reached the Quarterfinals twice, in 2007 and 2008.  2009 proved to be a down year with the team finishing 8–9–4 and only reaching the first round of the NCAA Tournament.

2010s

The decade began with a run to the NCAA Round of 16 in 2010.  2011 proved an even better season.  The Blue Devils set a new record for total wins in a season with 22 en route to the NCAA Final.  However, they would fall short to Stanford in the final.  2012 and 2013 also saw runs to the NCAA Quarterfinals, but the 2013 campaign only yielded 9 total wins.  In 2014, Lesesne left Duke for a head coaching job at Georgia, and was replaced by Erwin van Bennekom. 2014 proved difficult, as the Blue Devils had their first losing season since 2009 and ended a spell of eleven straight NCAA Tournament appearances.  However, 2014 would prove to be just a blip.  In the 2015 season, the Blue Devils women's soccer team made a run to the final of the Women's Soccer College Cup, which they lost to Penn State by a score of 1–0.  2017 saw the team set a program record for total wins with 23 and ACC wins with 10. The Blue Devils made another run to the College Cup.  This time they lost to UCLA on penalties.

2020s
The decade started with a season shortened by the COVID-19 pandemic.  The team played a shortened non-conference schedule in the spring and played a reduced ACC schedule.  They finished in fifth place in the ACC with a 4–2–2 record.  They reached the Quarterfinals of the NCAA Tournament, posting their best result in that tournament since 2017.  2021 saw a return to a more normal schedule where the team finished 16–4–1 and 7–2–1 in ACC play to finish in third place.  They again reached the Quarterfinals of the NCAA Tournament.  In 2022, the Blue Devils finished 15–5–3 overall and 6–2–2 in ACC play to finish in a tie for fourth place.  They extended their streak of NCAA Tournament Quarterfinal appearances to three, but were again stopped at that stage.

Personnel

Current roster

Team management

Facilities
 
The Blue Devils play on Koskinen Stadium. The Koskinen is also home to the men's soccer team, along with the men's and women's lacrosse teams. The stadium was dedicated in 1999 in honor of  John and Patricia Koskinen. The stadium can hold around 7,000 fans. Kennedy Tower is a new addition to Koskinen Stadium. It was recently dedicated in 2015 in honor of Chris and Ana Kennedy. Chris is the Duke Senior Deputy Director of Athletes. The Kennedy Tower, offers press boxes and hospitality suites to the top of Koskinen Stadium. The teams' locker rooms are in the Willam David Murray Building. The Duke Football team used to use the Murray Building from 1988 to 2002. Then the men's and women's soccer and lacrosse teams moved into the building. It houses the training room and weight room for all other Olympic Sports teams.

Seasons

Honors and awards

Michelle Cooper won the 2022 Hermann Trophy, becoming the first Duke women's soccer player to win college soccer's highest individual award.

United Soccer Coaches All-Americans

The Blue Devils have received 20 All-American honors, including eight first-team selections.

All-ACC honorees

The Blue Devils have received 105 All-ACC honors, including 50 first-team selections.

Isis Dallis also won ACC Freshman of the Year in 1997.

Coaching awards

Duke has received seven awards for coaching.

Notable alumni

Current Professionals
 Natasha Anasi – (2010–2013) – Currently with Breiðablik and Iceland international
 Toni Payne – (2013–2016) – Currently with Sevilla and Nigeria international
 Quinn – (2013–2017) – Currently with OL Reign and Canada international
 Imani Dorsey – (2014–2017) – Currently with NJ/NY Gotham FC and USA international
 Kayla McCoy – (2015–2018) – Currently with Rangers and Jamaica international
 Ella Stevens – (2016–2019) – Currently with the Chicago Red Stars
 Tess Boade - (2017-2021) – Currently with North Carolina Courage
 Lily Nabet - (2017-2021) – Currently with Angel City
 Michelle Cooper - (2021-2022) – Currently with Kansas City Current

Current Coaches
 Samantha Baggett – (Played 1994–1997) - Head coach at Florida since 2022
 Becca Moros - (Played 2003-2006) - Head coach at Arizona since 2021
 Katie Ely - (Coached 2011-2012) - Assistant coach at Maryland since 2022
 Steve Springthorpe - (Coached 2013) - Head coach at Tennessee Tech since 2014
 Erwin van Bennekom (Coached 2015-2018) - Head coach at Indiana since 2018

References

Works cited

External links
 

 
Soccer clubs in North Carolina
NCAA Division I women's soccer teams